Issaquena is an unincorporated community in Sharkey County, Mississippi, in the United States.

History
"Issaquena" is a Choctaw word meaning "Deer River". The community was named from Deer Creek upon which it is located.

References

Unincorporated communities in Sharkey County, Mississippi
Unincorporated communities in Mississippi
Mississippi placenames of Native American origin